Excelsior, at 317 North Oak Street (LA 133), Oak Ridge, Louisiana in Morehouse Parish in northern Louisiana, was built in 1869.  It was listed on the National Register of Historic Places on September 7, 1989.  The listing included five contributing buildings.

It was built as a wood frame five bay Italianate cottage in the hamlet of Oak Ridge, in an open rural setting among delta cotton fields.  It was expanded by gable-fronted flanking sections joined by extension of the front gallery floor, each with an Italianate facade.  The enlarged building was advertised as the Excelsior Hotel in 1880.

See also
National Register of Historic Places listings in Morehouse Parish, Louisiana

References

Houses on the National Register of Historic Places in Louisiana
Italianate architecture in Louisiana
Houses completed in 1869
Morehouse Parish, Louisiana